Stefano Cattai (born 29 November 1967 in Portogruaro) is a former Italian cyclist.

Major results
1989
1st Milano-Rapallo
3rd Girobio
1996
2nd Clásica de San Sebastián
1998
2nd Trofeo Matteotti

References

1967 births
Living people
Italian male cyclists
People from Portogruaro
Cyclists from the Metropolitan City of Venice